The 2002–03 Utah State Aggies men's basketball team represented Utah State University in the 2002–03 college basketball season. This was head coach Stew Morrill's 5th season at Utah State. The Aggies played their home games at the Dee Glen Smith Spectrum and were members of the Big West Conference. They finished the season 24–9, 12–6 to finish third in the regular season standings. They won the Big West tournament to earn an automatic bid to the 2003 NCAA Division I men's basketball tournament as No. 15 seed in the West Region. The Aggies fell to No. 2 seed and eventual National runner-up Kansas in the opening round.

Roster 

Source

Schedule and results

|-
!colspan=9 style=| Non-conference regular season

|-
!colspan=9 style=| Big West regular season

|-
!colspan=9 style=| Big West tournament

|-
!colspan=10 style=| NCAA tournament

Source

References

Utah State
Utah State Aggies men's basketball seasons
Utah State
Aggies
Aggies